Punkgasm is the sixth and final studio album by American math rock band Don Caballero. It was released in 2008. Apart from the song count-offs, television samples and ebullient vociferations heard on previous albums, it is the only album by the band to feature vocals.

Track listing

Personnel
Don Caballero
Damon Che – drums (tracks 1-11, 13); vocals (tracks 6, 11, 14); synthesizer (track 12); guitar (track 14)
Eugene Doyle – guitar (tracks 1-3, 5-13); vocals (track 5); drums (track 14)
Jason Jouver – bass guitar (tracks 1, 5-11, 14); guitar (tracks 2, 3, 13); vocals (tracks 5, 9); engineer (14)

Technical
Al Sutton – engineer (tracks 1-13); mixing
Allen Douches – mastering
Matt Dayak – photography, artwork

References

Don Caballero albums
2008 albums
Relapse Records albums